DeLanna Studi is a Cherokee actress who appears in DreamKeeper (2003), Edge of America (2003) and Shameless (2011).

Early life and education 
Studi was born on June 4, 1976  to mother, Deanna, and father, Thomas. Born into a small town of Muldrow, Oklahoma, she was very involved in her tribe, Cherokee. Being an active member in her tribe, she decided to follow in the footsteps of her uncle Wes Studi who became an actor to represent the Native American culture. Studi attended the University of Arkansas at Fort Smith and Northeastern State University in Tahlequah, Oklahoma, and studied architecture.

Career 
Studi moved to Los Angeles at the age of 22 to start her acting career. The first work that she ever appeared in was the Perfect music video by The Smashing Pumpkins (1998). After this video had surfaced on MTV, she was cast as Talks A Lot in a Hallmark movie, DreamKeeper (2003).

In 2015, Studi and her father retraced the 900 mile path, known as the Trail of Tears, that their family followed when forced to leave their homelands in the southeastern United States by the Indian Removal Act of 1830. This journey provided foundation for Studi's play And So We Walked.

Honors 

 2003 - American Indian Movie Award - Best Supporting Actress for Talks A Lot in DreamKeeper
 2004 - First Americans in the Arts - Outstanding Supporting Performance by an Actress in a TV Movie/Special (DreamKeeper)
2016 - Autry Museum of the American West - Butcher Scholar Award for And So We Walked

Reference list 

1976 births
Actresses from Oklahoma
Cherokee Nation artists
Living people
Native American actresses
20th-century Native Americans
21st-century Native Americans
20th-century Native American women
21st-century Native American women